Argyrotaenia cordillerae is a species of moth of the family Tortricidae. It is found in Venezuela.

The wingspan is 20-23.5 mm. The ground colour of the forewings is whitish, suffused with dirty pinkish and with scattered brownish scales and browner strigulation (fine streaks). The markings are chestnut brown. The hindwings are whitish, mixed with pale brownish cream in the distal half.

Etymology
The species name is derived from Spanish cordillera (meaning mountain range).

References

Moths described in 2006
cordillerae
Moths of South America